Blocked is a 2009 puzzle game for the iPhone and iPod Touch made by Joel Rosenberg.

Development
The game was based on the puzzle game Rush Hour.

Game description
The player maneuvers around gray blocks until a blue rock can escape. Blocks can only move left and right or up and down. The game has 100 challenges in 20 levels: easy, medium, hard, harder, and hardest.

Reception
James Savager of Macworld noted that Blocked is the perfect puzzle game for those quick moments during the day when you've got some time to kill and need a puzzle to solve. Lew Reed of Slide To Play pointed to the game's simplicity as being crucial to its success.

References

Puzzle video games